Favila or Fafila (died 739) was the second King of Asturias from 737 until his death. He was the only son and successor of Pelagius, the first Asturian monarch.

In 737 he founded the Church of Santa Cruz, in his capital of Cangas de Onís, but aside from this, nothing else about his reign is known.

Favila was killed by a bear while on a hunt in 739. As a result, Asturian chroniclers were critical of him for his excessive levity. However, royal hunts were not just for entertainment, they helped foster political unity within the court.

Favila was buried with his wife Froiluba in the Church of Santa Cruz de Cangas de Onís.

He was succeeded by his brother-in-law Alfonso, husband of his sister Ermesinda.

Notes

References

739 deaths
8th-century Visigothic people
Deaths due to bear attacks
Year of birth unknown
8th-century Asturian monarchs